(also known as The Group or ) was an avant-garde free improvisation group considered the first experimental composers collective.

History
The collective was formed by Italian composer Franco Evangelisti in Rome in 1964. Drawing on jazz, serialism, musique concrete, and other avant-garde techniques developed by contemporary classical music composers such as Luigi Nono and Giacinto Scelsi, the group was dedicated to the development of new music techniques by improvisation, noise-techniques, and anti-musical systems. The group members and frequent guests made use of extended techniques on traditional classical instruments, as well as prepared piano, tape music and electronic music. During the 1970s the music continued to evolve to embrace techniques and genres such as guitar feedback and funk. In addition to concerts, the group issued a series of albums and contributed to many scores by group member Ennio Morricone, including A Quiet Place in the Country (1968) and Cold Eyes of Fear (1971). The group slowly disbanded after Evangelisti's death in 1980.

Main Members
 Franco Evangelisti (piano, percussion)
 Ennio Morricone (trumpet, flute)
 Egisto Macchi (perc, celesta, strings)

Other Members at times
 Mario Bertoncini (perc, piano)
 Walter Branchi (double-bass)
 Richard Aaker Trythall (piano)
 John Heineman (trombone, cello)
 Roland Kayn (Hammond organ, vibraphone, marimba)
 Frederic Rzewski (piano)
 Giancarlo Schiaffini (trombone, assorted wind instruments)
 Giovanni Piazza (horn, flute, violin)
 Antonello Neri (piano, et al)
 Jesus Villa Rojo (clarinet, et al)  
 Bruno Battisti D'Amario (allsorts)

Discography
 1966 "Nuova Consonanza", LP RCA
 1967 "The Private Sea of Dreams" (as Il Gruppo), LP RCA Victor
 1968 "Improvisationen"  LP Deutsche Grammophon
 1970 "The Feed-back" (as The Group), LP RCA
 1973 "Improvvisazioni a Formazioni Variate" (also known as "Gruppo d'Improvvisazione Nuova Consonanza"), LP General Music
 1975 "Nuova Consonanza", LP Cinevox Records. Reissue 2007 CD Bella Casa
 1976 "Musica su Schemi", LP Cramps Records. Reissue 2002: LP Get Back, CD Ampersand
 1992 "1967-1975", CD Edition RZ
 2006 "Azioni", CD Die Schachtel
 2010 "Niente", CD Cometa Edizioni Musicali.  Reissue 
 2012 LP The Omni Recording Corporation/The Roundtable
 2011 "Eroina", CD Cometa Edizioni Musicali

References

Experimental musical groups
Italian electronic music groups
Musical groups established in 1964